The Downtown Hinsdale Historic District is a set of seventy-three buildings and one park in Hinsdale, Illinois.

History

The region was platted by William Robbins, the founder of Hinsdale, in 1865. The Chicago, Burlington and Quincy Railroad's (CB&Q) passenger station prompted several small businesses to develop across the street. Fifty-eight of the listed buildings were built for commerce, three for government, and nine for transportation. The remaining building is a theater. The shops are densely clustered in orthogonal patterns, and are mostly found on the south side of the railway tracks. The government buildings, including the Village Hall (Hinsdale Memorial Building) and U.S. Post Office are on the north side.

An article entitled "Hinsdale the Beautiful" in Campbell's Illustrated Journal prompted city officials to further beautify the city. The first major project was a state-of-the-art train station, which was designed by CB&Q architect Walter Theodore Krausch. The station became a model for the future construction of other stations on the line. The region north of the tracks became the next target, focusing on the Railroad Park (modern day Burlington Park). Commercial demand spiked in the early 20th century, even causing some gablefront residential buildings to be rezoned as commercial. The 1200-seat Hinsdale Theater was constructed in 1925 for $160,000. Chain retailers began to move into the downtown district starting in the 1920s, starting with a Loblaw food chain in 1929 (which was purchased in 1932 by the Jewel Tea Company). A Piggly Wiggly and a Walgreens also moved in during this period. In the 1920s, the city of Hinsdale overhead plans by a local car dealership to build the largest automobile garage "east of the Mississippi". To curb this plan, the city bought the proposed site and constructed a building dedicated to those who served and died in World War I. Construction on the Memorial Building finished in 1927.

Hinsdale is notorious for the aggressive teardown policies pursued by real estate agencies in its residential districts, but the commercial district has remain intact. The earliest buildings are on First and Washington Streets, which date from the 1880s and are in the Late Victorian, Italianate, and Queen Anne Styles. Colonial and Renaissance Revivals featured in early 20th century buildings until the Hinsdale Plan of 1923 dictated the use of Georgian Revival architecture. Eight of the properties were built after 1955. The district is served by three asphalt-paved parking lots.

Buildings

Contributing structures
These buildings are at least fifty years old and have had minimal alterations. They comprise the main core of the historic district.

 Hinsdale Memorial Building (1927) - Georgian Revival Style Village Hall and public library designed by Edwin H. Clark
 Railroad Park (1877) - A public park adjacent to the Hinsdale Memorial Building
 8 W. Chicago Ave. ( 1950) - Colonial Revival gas station
 10 W. Chicago Ave. (1926) - Classical Revival commercial block
 24 W. Chicago Ave. (1915) - Garage
 26-28 W. Chicago Ave. (c. 1940) - Modern Style commercial block
 Schweider & Mewherter Building (1944) - Classical Revival commercial block designed by R. Harold Zook
 9 E. First St. (1904) - Colonial Revival commercial block
 10-12 E. First St. (c. 1912) - Commercial Style commercial block
 Ostrum Building (1925) - Renaissance Revival style commercial block
 212-214 First Street Building (c. 1912) - Commercial block
 Police and Fire Station (1935) - Georgian Revival police and fire station designed by Philip Duke West
 Hinsdale Theater (1925) - Renaissance Revival movie theater designed by William Gibson Barfield
 Philip D. West Office (1950) - International Style commercial block designed by Philip D. West
 Ray J. Soukup Building (1929) - Renaissance Revival style commercial block
 Henry Reineke Building (1922) - Commercial block
 Papenhausen Building (1888) - Gablefront commercial block
 Buchholz Block (1895) - Renaissance Revival commercial block
 John Reineke Building/The Squire Shop (1941) - Classical Revival commercial block designed by R. Harold Zook
 17 W. First St. (1887) - Gablefront commercial block
 19 W. First St. (1887) - Gablefront commercial block
 Brewer Brothers Filling Station (1929) - Colonial Revival gas station designed by R. Harold Zook
 Hinsdale Trust and Savings Bank (1910) - Classical Revival temple-front
 Dieke Building (1920) - Commercial block
 LaGrange Gas Company (c. 1940) - Art Deco commercial block
 16 E. Hinsdale Ave. (1890) - Gablefront commercial block
 18 Edward F. Neidig Building (1907) - Prairie School commercial block
 Brush Hill Train Station (1898) - Renaissance Revival style railroad station designed by Walter Theodore Krausch
 Mohr Building (1909) - Commercial style commercial block
 Clineff's Home Restaurant Building (1928–30) - Classical & Renaissance Revival style commercial block designed by Francis A. Flaks
 32-34 E. Hinsdale Ave. (1912) - Commercial Style commercial block
 36 E. Hinsdale Ave. (1924) - Commercial block
 8 W. Hinsdale Ave. (c. 1927) - Colonial Revival commercial block
 Old Post Office (1926) - Colonial Revival commercial block
 18 W. Hinsdale Ave. (c. 1902) - Commercial block
 20 W. Hinsdale Ave. (1894) - Commercial block
 Fleck Automobile Building - Commercial Style commercial block
 McClintock Building/Auto Dealership (1922) Commercial block
 53 S. Lincoln St. (1935) - Colonial Revival freestanding commercial building
 United States Post Office Hinsdale, IL (1939–40) - Georgian Revival United States Post Office designed by Louis A. Simon
 33-35 S. Washington St. (1900) - Queen Anne and Classical Style commercial block
 Fox Building (1891) - Colonial Revival commercial block
 39 S. Washington St. (1897) - Queen Anne commercial block
 William Evernden Building (1894) - Commercial block
 41 S. Washington St. (1932) - Commercial style commercial block
 John Bohlander Building (1894) - Commercial block
 43 S. Washington St. (1901) - Commercial style commercial block
 Olson's Dry Goods (1909) - Colonial Revival commercial block
 46 S. Washington St. (1912) - Commercial block
 47 S. Washington St. (1881) - Italianate and Colonial Revival commercial block
 Oswald Building (1889) - Colonial Revival commercial block, 1928 remodel designed by R. Harold Zook
 Karlson's Building (1898) - Commercial style
 53 S. Washington St. (1927) - Classical Revival commercial block
 54 S. Washington St. (1892) - Queen Anne commercial block
 Hinsdale State Bank (1927) - Classical and Renaissance Revival commercial block designed by William Gibson Barfield

 Papenhausen Building (1888) - Queen Anne commercial block
 104-106 S. Washington St. (1910) - Commercial block
 Theidel Building (1925) - Renaissance Revival commercial block
 112-114 S. Washington St. (1929) - Tudor Revival commercial block designed by Edward P. Steinberg
 116-118 S. Washington St. (1915) - Commercial block

Non-contributing structures
These buildings are included as part of the listing, but are not of historical significance.
 John C. F. Merrill Building (1910) - Commercial block
 Hinsdale Chamber of Commerce (1978) - Commercial block designed by Philip Duke West
 Hinsdale Laundry Building (1894) - Gablefront commercial block
 Riccardo's Tailor Shop (1972) - Colonial Revival commercial block designed by Albert Nemoede
 Western United Gas and Electric Company (1909) - Temple-front
 26-26.5 E. Hinsdale Ave. (1957) - Commercial block
 40 E. Hinsdale Ave. (1998) - Neo-traditional commercial block
 13 S. Lincoln St. (c. 1920) - Commercial block
 40-46 Village Ct. (1908, 1960s) - Colonial Revival strip mall
 45 S. Washington St. (1993) - Commercial block
 48 S. Washington St. (1914/1919) - Commercial block
 50 S. Washington St. (1988) - Commercial block
 120 S. Washington St. (1965) - Colonial Revival commercial block

See also
Robbins Park Historic District, also platted by William Robbins

References
National Register of Historic Places Registration Form: Downtown Hinsdale Historic District

Historic districts in DuPage County, Illinois
Hinsdale, Illinois
National Register of Historic Places in DuPage County, Illinois
Historic districts on the National Register of Historic Places in Illinois